Caenispirillum bisanense is a Gram-negative, helical-shaped, non-spore-forming and motile bacterium from the genus of Caenispirillum which has been isolated from dye works sludge from Korea.

References

External links
Type strain of Caenispirillum bisanense at BacDive -  the Bacterial Diversity Metadatabase

 

Rhodospirillales
Bacteria described in 2007